BG BEN Newspaper (на български: Вестник БГ БЕН) is the biggest Bulgarian Newspaper in the UK. It is printed every two weeks (26 issues yearly, 2 issues a month in 10 months of the year, and 3 issues a month in 2 months of the year) on 48 pages in full colour, in 6000 copies.

Purposes 
The newspaper is fully dedicated to the consolidation of the Bulgarian community, the professional advice on the daily community problems and the creation of better knowledge and understanding of life and work in UK. The media has well-established partnerships and communication with the local institutions.

History 
BG BEN Newspaper was first printed in London on 30 March 2004. Its initial format was A4, printed weekly on 8 pages and supplemented by an additional 8-page insertion in English that was entitled 'Bulgaria' and was viewing the capacities of Bulgaria as a tourist, business and property destination.

In June 2005 the newspaper changed its format to a standard tabloid, switched to bi-weekly printing period and expanded its pages number to 32 pages.

In November 2007, its eight-page section in English was converted into Bulgarian pages, followed by an increase in the printed copies and further growth of its distribution network that resulted in ranking the newspaper as the largest Bulgarian printed media in Great Britain.

BG BEN Newspaper Today 
Roughly 90% of its distribution is spread among the most popular hubs of activity of the Bulgarian community in London. Its copies are delivered to more than 100 locations in London, Manchester, Birmingham, Bristol, Kent, Watford, Southampton and Stockport.

The newspaper contains news and events for the Bulgarians in the UK, advice on life and work in the UK and services available to the community, pages dedicated to rock music and rock events, facts and news about Bulgaria, adverts and leisure time pages.

Sources

External links 
 Официален сайт 
 BG BEN Newspaper on Facebook
 BG BEN Newspaper on Google+

Bulgarian-language newspapers
Newspapers published in London